Thomas Lucas Duerden (1898-1969) was an English cathedral organist, who served in Blackburn Cathedral.

Background

Thomas Lucas Duerden was born in Blackburn in 1898.

He served in the Royal Navy towards the end of World War I.

He was music master of Hutton Grammar School, Preston 1932 - 1947, and Queen Elizabeth's Grammar School, Blackburn, 1938 - 1963.

He was awarded a Fellowship of the Royal School of Church Music in 1964.

Career

Organist of:
St. John's Church, Blackburn 1919 - 1939
Blackburn Cathedral 1939 - 1964

References

English classical organists
British male organists
Cathedral organists
1898 births
1969 deaths
20th-century classical musicians
20th-century English musicians
20th-century organists
20th-century British male musicians
Male classical organists